Kundara East railway station (Code: KFV) is a railway station situated in Kundara town in Kollam, Kerala. Kundara East railway station falls under the Madurai railway division of the Southern Railway zone, Indian Railways. The station is one of two railway stations in the industrial town of Kundara. Other one is Kundara railway station.

Services

See also
 Kollam Junction railway station
 Paravur railway station
 Punalur railway station
 Kottarakara railway station

References

Kundara
Thiruvananthapuram railway division
1904 establishments in India
Railway stations opened in 1904